Kalinga is a 2006 Indian Tamil-language film directed by Ram Prabha and produced by Paul Brothers. The film stars Bala and Nandana, while Janagaraj and Rajan P. Dev play supporting roles. The music was composed by D. Imman, and the film released on 26 May 2006.

Cast
Bala as Kalinga
Nandana as Jyothi
Rajan P. Dev as Chanakya
Janagaraj
Ponnambalam
Anu Mohan
Pasi Sathya
Nellai Siva
Omakuchi Narasimhan

Soundtrack

References

2006 films
2000s Tamil-language films